Hala is a genus of Malagasy nursery web spiders that was first described by R. Jocqué in 1994.  it contains only two species, found only on Madagascar: H. impigra and H. paulyi.

See also
 List of Pisauridae species

References

Araneomorphae genera
Pisauridae
Spiders of Madagascar